The Estadio La Guarida is a multi-use stadium located in Puebla City, Puebla. It is currently used mostly for American football matches  The stadium has a capacity of 4,000 people.

References

External links

Sports venues in Puebla
La Guarida
Athletics (track and field) venues in Mexico
College American football venues in Mexico